Adam Hunt (born 21 August 1993) is an English professional darts player who competes in Professional Darts Corporation events.

Career
Hunt began competing in PDC events in 2011 and won his first tournament in his second month, beating Josh Jones 4–2 in the final of the opening youth tour event of the year. In 2012 he qualified for the UK Open for the first time and defeated Steve Maish 4–2, before losing 4–1 to Arron Monk in the second round. A year later he reached his first quarter-final on the Pro Tour at the first UK Open qualifier where he lost 6–1 to Michael van Gerwen. Hunt then won a Challenge Tour title with a 4–2 victory over Ricky Evans and advanced to the semi-finals of the World Youth Championship, where Michael Smith eliminated him 6–3. He went one better in the UK Open than last year as he lost in the third round 9–8 against Kevin McDine having led 4–1. Hunt's performances on the Challenge Tour saw him finish fourth on the Order of Merit to earn a two-year PDC tour card from 2014.

2014
In March, Hunt reached the third round of the UK Open for the second year in a row, but lost 9–5 to Paul Nicholson. Later in the month he beat Michael van Gerwen to reach the last 16 of the fourth Players Championship, where he was defeated 6–5 by Magnus Caris. Hunt was still competing in youth tournaments as well as the main professional tour and he won the ninth event with a 4–3 success over Rowby-John Rodriguez. He entered the 2014 PDC World Youth Championship as the number 1 seed, but lost in the last 16 to Kevin Voornhout 6-4. At the Gibraltar Darts Trophy, Hunt beat Mervyn King 6–3 and then survived 14 match darts from Dave Chisnall to edge him out 6–5 and reach his first European Tour quarter-final, but his run came to an end as Simon Whitlock defeated him 6–2.

2015
At the 2015 UK Open, Hunt lost 5–4 to Alan Tabern in the first round.  He competed in the 2015 PDC World Youth Championship but lost 6–2 to Bradley Kirk. He was knocked out in the first round of the International Darts Open and European Darts Matchplay and at the European Darts Trophy he beat Krzysztof Ratajski 6–5, before losing 6–1 to Michael van Gerwen in the second round. Hunt advanced to the last 16 of an event once this year, but he was defeated 6–1 by Mensur Suljović at the eighth Players Championship.

2016
After the 2016 World Championship Hunt was 71st on the Order of Merit, narrowly outside the top 64 who remain on tour. He therefore entered Q School, but could not advance beyond the last 64 on any of the four days to fall off the tour. He therefore had to build his year on Challenge and Development Tour events winning one of each. He beat Dean Reynolds 4−2 in the fourth Development event and Jamie Bain 5−3 in the sixth Challenge event. Hunt also lost in the final of the sixth Development event 4−2 to Ross Twell. He was the number 5 seed for the 2016 PDC World Youth Championship but lost 6-5 in the first round to Sven Groen.

2017
Hunt finished third on the Development Tour Order of Merit, winning one event as well as being a three time runner up that year. By finishing third, he earned a two-year PDC Tour Card for 2018/2019 due to 2nd placed Dimitri van den Bergh already possessing a Tour Card by virtue of being in the world’s top 64. He was the number 4 seed for the 2017 PDC World Youth Championship but lost 6-2 to Josh Payne in the second round.

2018
He came through the Tour Card Holders’ Qualifier on 26 November with victories over Terry Temple, Maik Langendorf, Bradley Brooks and Richie Burnett to reach the 2019 PDC World Darts Championship. Hunt lost in the first round 3–0 to eventual quarter finalist Luke Humphries.

World Championship results

PDC
2019: First round (lost to Luke Humphries 0–3)
2021: Third round (lost to Dirk van Duijvenbode 0–4)
2022: Second round (lost to Vincent van der Voort 0–3)

Performance timeline

PDC European Tour

(W) Won; (F) finalist; (SF) semifinalist; (QF) quarterfinalist; (#R) rounds 6, 5, 4, 3, 2, 1; (RR) round-robin stage; (Prel.) Preliminary round; (DNQ) Did not qualify; (DNP) Did not participate; (NH) Not held; (EX) Excluded; (WD) Withdrew

References

External links

Living people
Professional Darts Corporation former tour card holders
English darts players
1993 births
Sportspeople from Chester-le-Street